Alecsandro Barbosa Felisbino (born 4 February 1981 in Bauru), simply known as Alecsandro , is a Brazilian footballer who plays as a forward.

Career 
In 2006–07, he played on-loan, as a striker, for the Portuguese club Sporting. Most notably he is the brother-in-law of Portugal ace Deco.

Alecsandro joined Sporting with a promising record with his club Cruzeiro, 10 goals in 18 games. Alecsandro recorded his first Sporting goal against Desportivo Aves in a league match.

He is the son of Reinaldo Felisbino (Lela) and the brother of Richarlyson and brother-in-law to Deco who are all professional footballers. Alecsandro returned to Cruzeiro after his loan spell with Sporting ended.

However his agent Oldegard Filho has confirmed that Alecsandro will be leaving Cruzeiro in January 2008 with PSG the only club showing a firm interest.

Despite the interest from PSG, he later joined Al Wahda FC in January 2008. Sport Club Internacional have engaged Brazilian striker Alecsandro on 28 January 2009.

On 19 December 2012, in an exchange for Fillipe Soutto and Leonardo, Alecsandro signed with Atlético Mineiro, where he played with his sibling Richarlyson.

Alecsandro signed with Flamengo in January 2014. During a Copa do Brasil tie against América-RN, Alecsandro suffered a skull fracture in an aerial clash with a defender, which required surgery, making him miss the rest of the season.

On 11 January 2019, Alecsandro joined Campeonato Brasileiro Série B club São Bento.

Career statistics

Honours
Vitória
 Copa do Nordeste: 1999
 Campeonato Baiano: 2000, 2002, 2003, 2005

Cruzeiro
 Campeonato Mineiro: 2006

Sporting
 Taça de Portugal: 2006–07

Internacional
 Campeonato Gaúcho: 2009
 Suruga Bank Championship: 2009
 Copa Libertadores: 2010

Vasco da Gama
 Copa do Brasil: 2011

Atlético Mineiro
Campeonato Mineiro: 2013
Copa Libertadores: 2013

Flamengo
Campeonato Carioca: 2014

Palmeiras
Campeonato Brasileiro Série A: 2016

References

External links 

footballdatabase

1981 births
Living people
People from Bauru
Brazilian footballers
Brazilian expatriate footballers
Esporte Clube Vitória players
Sport Club do Recife players
Associação Atlética Ponte Preta players
Cruzeiro Esporte Clube players
Sporting CP footballers
Al Wahda FC players
Sport Club Internacional players
CR Vasco da Gama players
Clube Atlético Mineiro players
CR Flamengo footballers
Sociedade Esportiva Palmeiras players
Coritiba Foot Ball Club players
Esporte Clube São Bento players
Centro Sportivo Alagoano players
Campeonato Brasileiro Série A players
Campeonato Brasileiro Série B players
Copa Libertadores-winning players
Primeira Liga players
UAE Pro League players
Association football forwards
Expatriate footballers in Portugal
Expatriate footballers in the United Arab Emirates
Brazilian expatriate sportspeople in Portugal
Brazilian expatriate sportspeople in the United Arab Emirates
Footballers from São Paulo (state)